Emmanuel Danilo Clementino Silva (born 5 March 1982), known as Danilo, is a retired footballer who played as a goalkeeper.

Born in Brazil, he was a member, as a naturalized citizen, of the Equatorial Guinea national team.

Biography 
Danilo was born in Caruaru, a city located in the eastern of the Brazilian state of Pernambuco.

Football career
Danilo started his career in the Sport Recife's low divisions. In 2004, was loaned to Campinense and won the Campeonato Paraibano. Danilo had received an offer to play in the Spanish club Numancia, but he wasn't signed because this team already had three foreign players. He also has been linked to play in the Chinese football.

In 2013, while at the Alecrim ranks, Danilo was diagnosed with cerebral malaria and stayed in coma for 10 days, with doctors saying that he had 1% chance of surviving. However, he had fully recovered and resumed his professional career.

International career
Danilo is naturalized Equatoguinean since 2006, when Antônio Dumas (Brazilian coach who naturalized Brazilian footballers for Togo and Equatorial Guinea) was the coach of the Equatorial Guinea national football team. Since that time, Danilo has been consolidated in the goal of his new home. His better moment with the Nzalang Nacional (Equatorial Guinea national team's nickname) was against Cameroon in the 2008 Africa Cup of Nations qualification, on 9 September 2007.

He played in unofficial matches vs. the Region of Murcia and Extremadura in 2007 and against Brittany in 2011.

Titles

References

External links

Danilo on meuSport 

1982 births
Living people
People from Pernambuco
Naturalized citizens of Equatorial Guinea
Equatoguinean footballers
Equatorial Guinea international footballers
Association football goalkeepers
2012 Africa Cup of Nations players
Equatoguinean people of Brazilian descent
Campeonato Brasileiro Série B players
Campeonato Brasileiro Série D players
Sport Club do Recife players
Campinense Clube players
Agremiação Sportiva Arapiraquense players
Nacional Atlético Clube (Patos) players
Clube Atlético do Porto players
Club Sportivo Sergipe players
Araripina Futebol Clube players
Atlético Clube Corintians players
Timbaúba Futebol Clube players
Associação Desportiva Cabense players
Serra Talhada Futebol Clube players
Salgueiro Atlético Clube players
América Futebol Clube (PE) players
Treze Futebol Clube players
Alecrim Futebol Clube players
Globo Futebol Clube players
Auto Esporte Clube players